Lvivelectrotrans (Lviv communal enterprise "Lvivelectrotrans", LKP "Lvivelectrotrans" ) is a city monopolist in the field of electric transport of Lviv, a municipal enterprise owned by the Lviv community and is the operator of trams and trolleybuses in the city. 

As of early 2022, Lvivelectrotrans operates trolleybuses and trams. The company also uses 1 electric bus (Electron E19) on trolleybus routes.

As of September 1, 2022, the network includes 7 tram routes. The length of the tracks and contact network is 81.85 km (2022), and the route network is 99.1 km (2022). In 2021, trams performed 3.79 million km of transportation work.

The trolleybus network includes 11 routes. The length of the contact network is 136 km (01.2023), and the length of the route network is 169 km (01.2021). In 2021, trolleybuses performed 3.29 million km of transportation work.

At the end of 2021, 24,678,300 paid passengers (including 2,785,623 students) used the services of trams and trolleybuses.

Description
The head office is located in Lviv on Sakharov Street. Under the leadership of LCE "Lvivelectrotrans", there is one tramway, one trolleybus depot, a car repair workshop, a railroad service and a power network of the contact network. In March 2010 the company was ranked third in the rating of the best electric transport enterprises in Ukraine.

It is a loss-making enterprise, because the state authorities only compensate 60% of the cost of transportation of privileged categories of passengers. In order to remedy this situation, a composting system was introduced from 2008, which allowed a significant reduction in the number of personnel of the enterprise. All the conductors were released, instead the staff of controllers was recruited (40 people, which is several times less than the number of conductors). To reduce the number of "rabbits" - unpaid passengers - a large-scale advertising campaign is being conducted.

History
So, in November 2008, the advert of "Do not be the killer of Bandera" started, the main slogans of which were "Do not be like the killer of Stepan Bandera!" And "Betrayal of Ukraine begins with an unpaid travel!". The ideological basis was that the assassins of Stepan Bandera and Bohdan Stashinsky, had been recruited by the KGB for unpaid travel. Postcards describing this story and campaign slogans came to the home addresses of Lviv's citizens.

Between 2009 and 2010 a campaign was carried out of advertising "Lviv - the city of lions, not rabbits," in which No.1028 tram and trolley bus No.574 received a topical external design, which based Lions on being "courteous passengers who pay travel and rabbits hiding from the controllers".

Projects
Currently Lvivelectrotrans implementing several development projects with loans from EBRD and EIB. In particular, the purchase of new modern low-floor trolleybuses (50 units of Electron T19) and trams (10 units of Electron T5L64). In recent years there were projects with EBRD on infrastructure reconstruction and rolling stock procurement, in particular 30 used trams Tatra KT4D from Berlin (BVG).

References

See also 

 Trams in Lviv
 Lviv trolleybus
 Lviv bus

External links
 
Official website of Lvivelectrotrans

Transport in Lviv
Tram transport in Ukraine